Sir Charles William Cayzer, 3rd Baronet (6 January 1896 – 18 February 1940) was a British Conservative Party Member of Parliament (MP).

He was the son of Sir Charles William Cayzer, 2nd Baronet, of Gartmore, whom he succeeded in 1917. He was educated at Repton School, Oriel College, Oxford and the Royal Military College, Sandhurst, and was a Lieutenant in the 19th Royal Hussars from 1915 to 1919, serving in France from 1916 to 1918. He was re-employed at the start of World War II as Captain in the 15th/19th Hussars.

On 1 October 1919, he was married to Beatrice Eileen, daughter of James Meakin, Esq., of Westwood Manor, Staffordshire, and of the Countess Sondes. Lady Cayzer died in 1981.

From 1920 to 1921 he was an unpaid Additional Private Secretary to the Secretary for Scotland, Robert Munro. In the 1922 general election he was returned as member for the City of Chester division of Cheshire, and represented the constituency until his death on 18 February 1940 aged 44.  He was buried at Newtyle Cemetery, Angus.

Sir Charles Cayzer was a Director of Cayzer, Irvine and Company, Limited, and a member of the Royal Company of Archers, the Carlton Club and the Cavalry Club. He lived at 86, Eaton Square, London and at Kinpurnie Castle, Angus.

Sources
M. Stenton and S. Lees (eds), Who's Who of British Members of Parliament, Vol. III 1919–1945, Harvester Press Ltd 1979, p. 59.
thepeerage.com

References

External links 
 
 Cayzer Family Archive website

Cayzer, Charles William
Cayzer, Charles William
Cayzer, Charles William
Cayzer, Charles William
Cayzer, Charles William
Cayzer, Charles William
Cayzer, Charles William
Cayzer, Charles William
Cayzer, Charles William
Cayzer, Charles William
Cayzer, Charles William
Cayzer, Charles William
Cayzer, Charles William
Graduates of the Royal Military College, Sandhurst
Conservative Party (UK) MPs for English constituencies
Members of the Royal Company of Archers
British Army personnel of World War II
Royal Armoured Corps officers